Aung Shwe Prue Chowdhury (1 August 1914 – 8 August 2012) was a Bangladeshi from Bandarban belonging to Bangladesh Nationalist Party. He was the 15th King of Bohmong Circle.

Biography
Chowdhury was born on 1 August 1914. He was elected as a member of the East Pakistan Legislative Assembly in 1970. He was elected as a member of the Jatiya Sangsad from Chittagong Hill Tracts-2 in 1979. He was also appointed as the state minister of the Ministry of Food.

Chowdhury was appointed as the King of Bohmong Circle on 19 November 1998. He remained as the King of Bohmong Circle till his death.

Chowdhury was married to Abain Prue Chowdhury. They had six sons and two daughters. His son  Saching Prue Jerry is a former member of the Jatiya Sangsad. His co-sister-in-law Ma Mya Ching is also a former member of the Jatiya Sangsad.

Chowdury died on 8 August 2012 at the age of 98.

Controversy
Chowdhury collaborated with the Pakistan Army during the Liberation War of Bangladesh. He also took oath as a member of a provincial cabinet during the Liberation War of Bangladesh.

References

1914 births
2012 deaths
People from Bandarban District
2nd Jatiya Sangsad members
Bangladesh Nationalist Party politicians
Marma people
Bangladeshi Buddhists
State Ministers of Food (Bangladesh)